Xyroptila zambesi is a moth of the family Pterophoridae which is endemic to Zimbabwe.

References

Moths described in 2006
Endemic fauna of Zimbabwe
Moths of Africa
zambesi